General elections were held in Luxembourg on 30 May 1954. The Christian Social People's Party won 26 of the 52 seats in the Chamber of Deputies.

Results

Footnotes

Chamber of Deputies (Luxembourg) elections
Legislative election, 1954
Luxembourg
1954 in Luxembourg
May 1954 events in Europe